Acianthera per-dusenii is a species of orchid plant native to Panama.

References 

per-dusenii
Flora of Panama
Plants described in 1936